Sector 78, is a location close to the centre of Noida city. It is dominated by residential areas, interspersed by commercial areas in between. The proposed Vedvan Park, a theme park dedicated to Indian culture is soon to come up in Sector 78,  Noida is a part of National Capital Region of India.

Geography 
The sector is located in Gautam Buddh Nagar district of Uttar Pradesh state India. It is bound on the west and south-west by the Yamuna River, on the north and north-west by the city of Delhi, on the north-east by the cities of Delhi and Ghaziabad, India and on the north-east, east and south-east by the Hindon River. Sector 78 falls under the catchment area of the Yamuna river and is located on land, adjoining the old river bed. It is famous for its modern and swish lifestyle.

Education 
Sector 78 houses The Manthan School, adjoining Mahagun Moderne Housing Society,  and several tutorial institutes namely Unloq Minds Tutorials (Antriksh Golf View 2 Mart), Wisdom Cubes (Sunshine Helios), S.F.A.T Coaching (Sikka Kaima Galleria) and more.

Economy 
The sector houses two malls and several marts, viz. Mahagun Mart, Hyde Park Crowne, upcoming Windsor Court Shopping Mart, Antriksh Golf View 2 Shopping Mart,  Sunshine Helios Shopping Mart, Sikka Kaima Galleria and Aditya Urban Casa Shopping Mart, in addition to in-premises shops in Antriksh Golf View 1. It houses branches of leading Indian banks like Axis Bank, HDFC Bank, ICICI Bank, IndusInd Bank, Kotak Bank, Yes Bank and more.

Transport 
Sector 78 has good road connectivity. The Aqua Line Metro,  service connects Sector 52, Noida with Depot Station, Greater Noida. The sector is served by Sector 101 Metro Station. There are public buses connecting the sector with other sectors in Noida, in addition to on-hire three wheelers (auto rickshaws) and on-call cabs.

Medicare 
Dr Rahul Gupta Neurosurgeon in Noida
Dr Ekta Singh Gyenocologist in Noida

See also 
 Buddh International Circuit
 Greater Noida
 Gurgaon
 Noida
 Uttar Pradesh

References

https://www.urbantransportnews.com/noida-metros-aqua-line-linking-noida-greater-noida-opens-for-public/
https://www.cityspidey.com/news/8584/noida-hyde-park-residents-take-out-kalash-yatra-on-foundation-day-of-temple
https://www.apnnews.com/mahagun-group-receives-occupancy-certificate-for-mahagun-mezzaria/
https://www.cityspidey.com/news/10026/pollution-push-to-health-in-noida
https://www.cityspidey.com/news/11565/mahagun-moderne-residents-pour-their-heart-out-for-blood-donation/

Neighbourhoods in Noida